The Anglican Church of Saint Mary The Virgin in Hutton within the English county of Somerset was built in the 15th century. It is a Grade II* listed building.

History

The church was built in the 15th century on the site of an earlier church.

The parish is part of the benefice of Hutton and Locking, within the Diocese of Bath and Wells.

Architecture

The church has a two-bay nave with a waggon roof, chancel and three-bay aisle. There is a three-stage west tower supported by diagonal buttresses. Within the tower is a ring of six bells. The bells were rehung and the sixth bell added in 2009.

See also
 List of ecclesiastical parishes in the Diocese of Bath and Wells

References

External links

 Church web site

Grade II* listed buildings in North Somerset
Grade II* listed churches in Somerset
15th-century church buildings in England